The James Beard Foundation Awards are annual awards presented by the James Beard Foundation to recognize culinary professionals in the United States. The awards recognize chefs, restaurateurs, authors and journalists each year, and are generally scheduled around James Beard's May birthday.

The foundation also awards annually since 1998 the designation of America's Classic for local independently-owned restaurants that reflect the charcter of the community.

1991 awards
The first James Beard Foundation Awards were presented on May 6, 1991, aboard the luxury liner M/S New Yorker, in a ceremony hosted by George Plimpton.

Restaurant and Chef Awards
 Best Chef: California: Joachim Splichal, Patina; Los Angeles, CA
 Best Chef: Mid-Atlantic: Jean-Louis Palladin, Jean-Louis at the Watergate Hotel; Washington, D.C.
 Best Chef: Midwest: Rick Bayless, Topolobampo; Chicago, IL
 Best Chef: Northeast: Jasper White, Jasper's; Boston, MA
 Best Chef: Northwest:Caprial Pence, Fuller's; Seattle, WA
 Best Chef: Southeast: Emeril Lagasse, Emeril's; New Orleans, LA
 Best Chef: Southwest: Stephan Pyles, Routh Street Café; Dallas, TX
 Outstanding Chef: Wolfgang Puck, Spago; West Hollywood, CA
 Outstanding Pastry Chef: Nancy Silverton, Campanile; Los Angeles, CA
 Outstanding Restaurant: Bouley; New York, NY
 Outstanding Wine & Spirits Professional: Robert Mondavi, Robert Mondavi Winery; Oakville, CA
 Outstanding Wine Service: Square One; San Francisco, CA
 Rising Star Chef: Todd English, Olives; Cambridge, MA
 Humanitarian of the Year: Bill Shore, Share Our Strength; Washington, DC
 Lifetime Achievement Award: M.F.K. Fisher

Book Awards
 Cookbook Hall of Fame: The Food of France and The Food of Italy by Waverly Root
 Cookbook of the Year: Cocolat: Extraordinary Chocolate Desserts by Alice Medrich
 American Regional: Lee Bailey's Southern Food and Plantation Houses by Lee Bailey
 Americana: America the Beautiful Cookbook by Phillip Stephen Schulz
 Baking & Desserts: Rose's Christmas Cookies by Rose Levy Beranbaum
 Best Food Photography Cocolat: Extraordinary Chocolate Desserts, photographer Patricia Brabant
 Every Day Cooking: The Short-Cut Cook by Jacques Pépin
 Fruits, Vegetables & Grains: Pasta: Creating, Celebrating and Saucing by Constance Jones
 Health and Diet: The Art of Low-Calorie Cooking by Sally Schneider
 International: Please to the Table: The Russia Cookbook by Anya von Bremzen
 Single Subject: Susan Costner's Great Sandwiches by Susan Costner
 Special Occasions: Dinner Party by Jane Freiman
 Techniques: The Thrill of the Grill: Techniques, Recipes & Down-Home Barbecue by John Doc Willoughby and Christopher Schlesinger
 Wine & Spirits: The Wine Atlas of Italy: A Traveler's Guide to the Vineyards by Burton Anderson
 Writings on Food: Epicurian Delight: The Life & Times of James Beard by Evan Jones

1992 awards
The second annual James Beard Awards were presented on May 4, 1992, at New York's Lincoln Center, hosted by Phyllis George.

Restaurant and Chef Awards
 Best Chef: California & Hawaii: Michel Richard, Citrus; Los Angeles, CA
 Best Chef: Mid-Atlantic: Patrick O'Connell, Inn at Little Washington; Washington, VA
 Best Chef: Midwest: Charlie Trotter, Charlie Trotter's; Chicago, IL
 Best Chef: New York City: Daniel Boulud, Le Cirque; New York, NY
 Best Chef: Northeast: Lydia Shire, Biba; Boston, MA
 Best Chef: Northwest: Barbara Figueroa, The Hunt Club; Seattle, WA
 Best Chef: Southeast: Mark Militello, Mark's Place; N. Miami, FL
 Best Chef: Southwest: Robert Del Grande, Café Annie; Houston, TX
 Outstanding Chef: Alice Waters, Chez Panisse; Berkeley, CA
 Outstanding Pastry Chef: Albert Kumin, Vie de Frances International Pastry Arts Center; Elmsford, NY
 Outstanding Restaurant: Chez Panisse; Berkeley, CA
 Outstanding Service: Union Square Cafe, New York, NY
 Outstanding Wine & Spirits Professional: André Tchelistcheff, Napa, CA
 Outstanding Wine Service: Bern's Steak House; Tampa, FL
 Rising Star Chef: Debra Ponzek, Montrachet; New York, NY
 Humanitarian of the Year: Gael Greene, Citymeals-on-Wheels; New York, NY
 Lifetime Achievement Award: Craig Claiborne

Book Awards
 Cookbook Hall of Fame: The Silver Palate Cookbook by Julee Rosso and Sheila Lukins
 Cookbook of the Year: Sauces: Classical and Contemporary Sauce Making by James Peterson
 Americana: Spirit of the Harvest: North American Indian Cooking by Beverly Cox and Martin Jacobs
 Baking & Desserts: Great Cakes by Carole Walter
 Best Food Photography: A Vineyard Garden, photographer Molly Chappellet
 Convenience: From Pantry to Table by Marlena Spieler
 General: Pleasures of the Good Earth by Edward Giobbi
 Healthier Living: Chez Eddy Living Heart Cookbook by Antonio M. Gotto, Jr, MD
 International: Simply French: Patricia Wells Presents the Cuisine of Joel Robuchon by Patricia Wells
 Italian: The Harry's Bar Cookbook: Recipes and Reminiscences from the World Famous Venice Bar and Restaurant by Arrigo Cipriani
 Single Subject: Sauces: Classical and Contemporary Sauce Making by James Peterson
 Special Occasions: New Home Cooking by Florence Fabricant
 Wine & Spirits: Oz Clark's New Classic Wines by Oz Clarke
 Writings on Food: Food and Friends by Simone Beck and Suzanne Patterson

1993 awards
The third annual James Beard Awards were presented on May 3, 1993, at the New York Marriott Marquis, and journalism awards were presented for the first time.

Restaurant and Chef Awards
 Best Chef: California: (TIE) Bradley Ogden, Lark Creek Inn; Larkspur, CA AND Jeremiah Tower, Stars, San Francisco, CA
 Best Chef: Mid-Atlantic: Marcel Desaulniers, The Trellis; Williamsburg, VA
 Best Chef: Midwest: Jimmy Schmidt, The Rattlesnake Club; Detroit, MI
 Best Chef: New York City: Alfred Portale, Gotham Bar & Grill; New York, NY
 Best Chef: Northeast: Johanne Killeen and George Germon, Al Forno; Providence, RI
 Best Chef: Pacific Northwest: Roy Yamaguchi, Roy's; Honolulu, HI
 Best Chef: Southeast: Susan Spicer, Bayona; New Orleans, LA
 Best Chef: Southwest: Vincent Guerithault, Vincent's on Camelback; Phoenix, AZ
 Outstanding Chef : (tie) Larry Forgione, An American Place; New York, NY & Jean-Louis Palladin, Jean-Louis at the Watergate Hotel; Washington, DC
 Outstanding Pastry Chef: Lindsey Shere, Chez Panisse; Berkeley, CA
 Outstanding Restaurant: The Inn at Little Washington; Washington, VA
 Outstanding Service: Commander's Palace; New Orleans, LA
 Outstanding Wine & Spirits Professional: Kevin Zraly, Windows on the World; New York, NY
 Outstanding Wine Service: Charlie Trotter's; Chicago, IL
 Rising Star Chef: Bobby Flay, Mesa Grill; New York, NY
 Humanitarian of the Year: Ben Cohen and Jerry Greenfield, Ben & Jerry's; Waterbury, VT
 Lifetime Achievement Award: André Soltner

Book Awards
 Cookbook Hall of Fame: Simple French Food by Marian Burros and Richard Olney
 Cookbook of the Year: The Splendid Table: Recipes from Emilia Romagna, The Heartland of Northern Italian Food by Lynne Rossetto Kasper
 Americana: New York Cookbook by Molly O'Neill
 Baking & Desserts: Death by Chocolate: The Last Word on a Consuming Passion by Marcel Desaulniers
 Best Food Photography: France: A Culinary Journey, photographer Peter Johnson
 Entertaining & Special Occasions: Alfresco by Linda Burgess and Rosamond Richardson
 Fruits, Vegetables & Grains: Quick Vegetarian Pleasures by Jeanne Lemlin
 General: Back to Square One: Old-World Food in a New-World Kitchen by Joyce Goldstein
 International: Yamuna's Table by Yamuna Devi
 Italian: Essentials of Classic Italian Cooking by Marcella Hazan
 Light & Healthy: Steven Raichlen's High Flavor, Low-Fat Cooking by Steven Raichlen
 Quick & Easy: Great Food Without Fuss by Fran McCullough and Barbara Witt
 Single Subject: Preserving Today by Jeanne Lesem
 Wine & Spirits: The Vintner's Art: How Great Wines are Made by Hugh Johnson and James Halliday
 Writings on Food: Peppers: A Story of Hot Pursuits by Amal Naj

Journalism Awards
 Features/Consumer Information: Ginger Munsch Crichton, Leslie Barker, and Rita Rubin, "Eating and Aging", Dallas Morning News
 Literary Writing About Food, Wine & Spirits: Jeffrey Steingarten, "Simply Red", Vogue
 News/Investigative Reporting: Trudy Lieberman, "Is Our Fish Fit to Eat", Consumer Reports
 Restaurant Review/Critique: Alan Richman, GQ

1994 awards
The 1994 James Beard Awards were presented on May 2, 1994, at the New York Marriott Marquis, televised live for the first time on the Food Network. Four new electronic media awards were given this year.

Restaurant and Chef Awards
 Best Chef: California: Joyce Goldstein, Square One; San Francisco, CA
 Best Chef: Mid-Atlantic: Patrick Clark, The Hay-Adams Hotel; Washington, DC
 Best Chef: Midwest: Paul Bartolotta, Spiaggia; Chicago, IL
 Best Chef: New York City: David Bouley, Bouley; New York, NY
 Best Chef: Northeast: Todd English, Olives; Charlestown, MA
 Best Chef: Pacific Northwest: (TIE) Tom Douglas, Dahlia Lounge; Seattle, WA AND Monique Barbeau, Fullers; Seattle, WA
 Best Chef: Southeast: Allen Susser, Chef Allen's; North Miami Beach, FL
 Best Chef: Southwest: Dean Fearing, Mansion on Turtle Creek; Dallas, TX
 Outstanding Chef : Daniel Boulud, Daniel; New York, NY
 Outstanding Pastry Chef: Jacques Torres, Le Cirque; New York, NY
 Outstanding Restaurant: Spago; West Hollywood, CA
 Outstanding Service: Rainbow Room; New York, NY
 Outstanding Wine & Spirits Professional: Randall Grahm, Bonny Doon Vineyard; Santa Cruz, CA
 Outstanding Wine Service: Valentino; Santa Monica, CA
 Rising Star Chef: Sarah Stegner, The Ritz-Carlton; Chicago, IL
 Humanitarian of the Year: Wolfgang Puck and Barbara Lazaroff, Spago; Beverly Hills, CA
 Lifetime Achievement Award: Robert Mondavi; Napa, CA

Book Awards
 Cookbook Hall of Fame: Alice Let's Eat, American Fried and Third Helpings by Calvin Trillin
 Cookbook of the Year: Madhur Jaffrey's A Taste of the Far East by Madhur Jaffrey
 Americana: Nathalie Dupree's Southern Memories by Nathalie Dupree
 Baking & Desserts: Secrets of a Jewish Baker: Authentic Jewish Rye and Other Breads by George Greenstein
 Best Food Photography: Lemons: A Country Garden Cookbook, photographer Kathryn Kleinman
 Convenience: Dinner in Minutes: Memorable Meals for Busy Cooks by Linda Gassenheimer
 Entertaining & Special Occasions: Celebrations by Joe Famularo
 Fruits, Vegetables & Grains: Faye Levy's International Vegetable Cookbook by Faye Levy
 General: Little Meals by Rozanne Gold
 Healthy Focus: The Joslin Diabetes Gourmet Cookbook by Bonnie Sanders Polin and Frances Towner Giedt
 International: Madhur Jaffrey's A Taste of the Far East by Madhur Jaffrey
 Italian: Italy in Small Bites by Carol Field
 References & Resources: Recipes Into Type by Dolores Simon and Joan Whitman
 Single Subject: A Seafood Celebration by Sheryl and Mel London
 Wine & Spirits: Wine Atlas of California by James Halliday
 Writings on Food: Home on the Range: A Culinary History of the American West by Cathy Luchetti

Electronic Media Awards
 Best Culinary Video: Today's Gourmet with Jacques Pepin, host: Jacques Pepin, producers: Peter Stein and Peggy Scott
 Best Radio Show on Food: California Foods, host: Diane Worthington; KABC
 Best Television Cooking Show: Yan Can Cook, host: Martin Yan; PBS
 Best Television Food Journalism: Burt Wolf's Table, journalist: Burt Wolf; WKNO-TV

Journalism Awards
 M.F.K. Fisher Distinguished Writing: Margo True, "Backstage at Café Annie", Houston Metropolitan
 Magazine Feature Reporting: Linda Beaulieu, "Native American", The National Culinary Review
 Magazine Restaurant Review or Critique: Alan Richman, GQ
 Magazine Series: Jeffrey Steingarten, Vogue
 Magazine Writing on Diet, Nutrition & Health: Maureen Callahan, "Diets Don't Work", Cooking Light
 Newspaper Feature Reporting: Ruth Reichl, "Seafood Seminar: A Day at the Markets", Los Angeles Times
 Newspaper News Reporting: Merle Alexander, "Test Tube Food", The Oregonian
 Newspaper Restaurant Review or Critique: Penelope Corcoran, The Arizona Republic
 Newspaper Series: Eleanor Ostman and Ellen Carlson, St. Paul Pioneer Press
 Newspaper Writing on Diet, Nutrition & Health: Karin A. Welzel, "Salt Shakes Loose", The Columbus Dispatch

1995 awards
The 1995 James Beard Awards were presented on May 10, 1995, at the New York Marriott Marquis, in a televised ceremony hosted by Robin Leach and Donna Hanover.

Restaurant and Chef Awards
 Best Chef: California: Gary Danko, The Dining Room at the Ritz Carlton; San Francisco, CA
 Best Chef: Mid-Atlantic: Robert Kinkead, Kinkead's; Washington, DC
 Best Chef: Midwest: Jean Joho, Everest; Chicago, IL
 Best Chef: New York City: Gray Kunz, Lespinasse; New York, NY
 Best Chef: Northeast: Gordon Hamersley, Hamersley's Bistro; Boston, MA
 Best Chef: Northwest/Hawaii: Tamara Murphy, Campagne; Seattle, WA
 Best Chef: Southeast: Elizabeth Terry, Elizabeth's on 37th; Savannah, GA
 Best Chef: Southwest: Christopher Gross, Christopher and Christopher's Bistro; Phoenix, AZ
 Best New Restaurant: Nobu; New York, NY
 Outstanding Chef: Rick Bayless, Frontera Grill and Topolobampo; Chicago, IL
 Outstanding Pastry Chef: Francois Payard, Daniel; New York, NY
 Outstanding Restaurant: Le Cirque; New York, NY
 Outstanding Service: Montrachet; New York, NY
 Outstanding Wine & Spirits Professional: Marvin Shanken, Wine Spectator Magazine; New York, NY
 Outstanding Wine Service: Montrachet; New York, NY
 Rising Star Chef: Traci Des Jardins, Rubicon; San Francisco, CA
 Humanitarian of the Year: Paul Newman, A.E. Hotchner, and Ursula Hotchner, Newman's Own; Westport, CT
 Lifetime Achievement Award: Chuck Williams; San Francisco, CA
 Outstanding Restaurant Design: Chhada, Siembieda, & Partners, Ltd., Fifty Seven Fifty Seven Restaurant; New York, NY
 Outstanding Restaurant Graphics: Bow & Arrow Press, Gramercy Tavern; New York, NY

Book Awards
 Cookbook Hall of Fame: Greene on Greens by Bert Greene
 Cookbook of the Year: Chocolate and the Art of Low-Fat Desserts by Alice Medrich
 Accent on Flavors: Smoke & Spice by Bill Jamison and Cheryl Alters Jamison
 Baking & Desserts: Classic Home Desserts by Richard Sax
 Entertaining & Special Occasions: Entertaining on the Run by Marlene Sorosky Gray
 Food of the Americas: Jewish Cooking in America by Joan Nathan
 Fruits, Vegetables & Grains: Onions, Onions, Onions by Linda and Fred Griffith
 General Interest: Now You're Cooking: Everything a Beginner Needs to Know to Start Cooking Today by Elaine Corn
 Healthy Focus: Chocolate and the Art of Low-Fat Desserts by Alice Medrich
 International: The Cooking the Eastern Mediterranean by Paula Wolfert
 Single Subject: The Burger Meisters by Marcel Desaulniers
 Technical & Reference: The Book of Food by Frances Bissell
 Vegetarian: Moosewood Restaurant Cooks at Home by The Moosewood Collective (Moosewood Restaurant)
 Wine & Spirits: The Oxford Companion to Wine by Jancis Robinson
 Writing on Food: Treasures of the Italian Table by Burton Anderson

Electronic Media Awards
 Best Culinary Video: Julia Child and Jacques Pepin, Cooking in Concert; hosts: Julia Child and Jacques Pepin, producer: Geoffrey Drummond
 Best Culinary Radio Show: California Foods, host: Diane Worthington; KABC
 Best Television Cooking Series: Pierre Franey's Cooking in France; host: Pierre Franey, producers: Charles Pinsky and John Potthast; Maryland Public Television
 Best Television Food Journalism: CNN Presents: Food to Die For; host: Carolyn O'Neil, producer: Stacy Jolna; CNN

Journalism Awards
 M.F.K. Fisher Distinguished Writing: Alison A. Cook, "Church of the Immaculate Barbecue/Tempting Tapas", Houston Press
 Magazine Feature with Recipes: Sally Schneider, "Truffles in Black and White", Saveur
 Magazine Feature without Recipes: Amanda Mayer Stinchecum, "Making Tea", Saveur
 Magazine Restaurant Review or Critique: Alan Richman, GQ
 Magazine Series: Elizabeth Schneider,  "Vegetable Wise", Eating Well
 Magazine Writing on Diet, Nutrition & Health: Laura Shapiro, "The Skinny on Fat", Newsweek
 Newspaper Feature Writing with Recipes: Michelle Huneven, "Cooking in the Slow Lane", Los Angeles Times
 Newspaper Feature Writing without Recipes: Steven Pratt, "Feeding Frenzy", Chicago Tribune
 Newspaper News Reporting: Daniel P. Puzo, "Unsafe at any Meal?", Los Angeles Times
 Newspaper Restaurant Review or Critique: Alison A. Cook, Houston Press
 Newspaper Series: Elaine Louie, "Ethnic Eating in New York", The New York Times
 Newspaper Writing on Diet, Nutrition & Health: Carole Sugarman, "Can a Chef Scale Back? The Diet Diary of Roberto Donna", The Washington Post

1996 awards
The 1996 James Beard Awards were presented on April 29, 1996, at the New York Marriott Marquis. The Monday-night ceremony was hosted by Al Roker and Nina Griscom, while the cookbook and journalism awards were announced one night earlier at a dinner at the Yale Club of New York City.

Restaurant and Chef Awards
 Best Chef: California: Thomas Keller, The French Laundry; Yountville, CA
 Best Chef: Mid-Atlantic: Roberto Donna, Galileo; Washington, DC
 Best Chef: Midwest: Sanford D'Amato, Sanford; Milwaukee, WI
 Best Chef: New York City: Jean-Georges Vongerichten, JoJo; New York, NY
 Best Chef: Northeast: Christopher Schlesinger, East Coast Grill/Blue Room; Cambridge, MA
 Best Chef: Pacific Northwest/Hawaii: Alan Wong, Alan Wong's; Honolulu, HI
 Best Chef: Southeast: Guenter Seeger, The Dining Room at The Ritz-Carlton, Buckhead; Atlanta, GA
 Best Chef: Southwest: Mark Miller, Coyote Cafe; Santa Fe, NM
 Best New Restaurant: Brasserie Jo; Chicago, IL
 Outstanding Chef : Jeremiah Tower, Stars; San Francisco, CA
 Outstanding Pastry Chef: Sarabeth Levine, Sarabeth's; New York, NY
 Outstanding Restaurant: Commander's Palace; New Orleans, LA
 Outstanding Service: Valentino; Santa Monica, CA
 Outstanding Wine & Spirits Professional: Jamie Davies and Jack Davies, Schramsberg Vineyards; Calistoga, CA
 Outstanding Wine Service: Chanterelle; New York, NY
 Rising Star Chef: Douglas Rodriguez, Patria; New York, NY
 Humanitarian of the Year: Danny Meyer, New York, NY
 Lifetime Achievement Award: Peter Kump; New York, NY
 Outstanding Restaurant Design: Ogawa/Depardon Architects, Bar 89; New York, NY
 Outstanding Restaurant Graphics: Mike Fink, The Double A; Santa Fe, NM

Book Awards
 Cookbook Hall of Fame: La Technique and La Methode by Jacques Pepin
 Cookbook of the Year: Flatbreads and Flavors: A Baker's Atlas by Naomi Duguid and Jeffrey Alford
 Baking & Desserts: How to Bake by Nicholas Malgieri
 Best Food Photography: In & Out of the Kitchen in Fifteen Minutes of Less, photographer Sara Taylor
 Fruits, Vegetables & Grains: A Cook's Book of Mushrooms: With 100 Recipes for Common and Uncommon Varieties by Jack Czarnecki
 General Interest: Jim Fobel's Big Flavors by Jim Fobel
 Healthy Focus: Lighter, Quicker, Better: Cooking for the Way We Eat Today by Richard Sax and Marie Simmons
 International: Susanna Foo Chinese Cuisine: The Fabulous Flavors & Innovative Recipes of North America's Finest Chinese Cook by Susanna Foo
 Regional American: The Border Cookbook: Authentic Home Cooking of the American Southwest and Northern Mexico by Bill Jamison and Cheryl Alters Jamison
 Restaurants and Chefs: In Julia's Kitchen with Master Chefs by Julia Child
 Single Subject: The Whole World Loves Chicken Soup by Mimi Sheraton
 Vegetarian: High-Flavor, Low-Fat Vegetarian Cooking by Steven Raichlen
 Wine & Spirits: Wine Spectator's California Wine by James Laube
 Writings on Food: Becoming a Chef: With Recipes and Reflections from America's Leading Chefs by Andrew Dornenburg

Electronic Media Awards
 Best Local Television Cooking Show: Good Eating; host: Myke Motley, producer: Steve Dolinsky, CLTV
 Best National Television Cooking Show: In Julia's Kitchen with Master Chefs; host; Julia Child, producer: Geoffrey Drummond, WMVS/Milwaukee Public Television
 Best Radio Show on Food: Seasonings, host: Vertamae Grosvenor, producer: Sandra Rattley-Lewis; NPR
 Best Television Food Journalism: Yan Can Cook: The Best of China; host: Martin Yan, producer: DeAnne Hamilton D'Aria; KQED

Journalism Awards
 M.F.K. Fisher Distinguished Writing: Paula Wolfert, "My Old Moroccan Home", Saveur
 Magazine Feature with Recipes: Robb Walsh, "Hot-Sauce Safari", American Way
 Magazine Feature without Recipes: Leslie Brenner, "Eureka! He Turns Oil Into Gold", Avenue
 Magazine Restaurant Review or Critique: Alan Richman, GQ
 Magazine Series: Elizabeth Schneider,  "Purveyor", Food Arts
 Magazine Writing on Diet, Nutrition & Health: Ed Blonz, "Scientific Studies: How to Handle the Hype", Vegetarian Times
 Magazine Writing on Spirits, Wine & Beer: Michael Bonadies, "Cote de Beaune", Wine & Spirits
 Newspaper Feature Writing with Recipes: Kristin Eddy, "Tea-A Brand New Bag", The Atlanta-Journal/The Atlanta-Constitution
 Newspaper Feature Writing without Recipes: Bryan Miller, "Inside Peek at a 3-Star Kitchen", The New York Times
 Newspaper News Reporting: Daniel P. Puzo, "What Happened to California's Seafood?", Los Angeles Times
 Newspaper Restaurant Review or Critique: Ruth Reichl, The New York Times
 Newspaper Series: Steven Pratt, "On America's Plate", Chicago Tribune
 Newspaper Writing on Diet, Nutrition & Health: Jane Snow, "Food", The Beacon Journal
 Newspaper Writing on Spirits, Wine & Beer: Benjamin M. Myers, "It Must Be Spring-Bock is Back", The Washington Post

1997 awards
The 1997 James Beard Awards were presented on May 5, 1997, at the New York Marriott Marquis. The Monday-night ceremony was hosted by Joel Grey and Donna Hanover, while the journalism awards were announced on the preceding Friday.

Chef and Restaurant Awards
 Best Chef: California: Hubert Keller, Fleur de Lys; San Francisco, CA
 Best Chef: Mid-Atlantic: Susanna Foo, Susanna Foo; Philadelphia, PA
 Best Chef: Midwest: (TIE) Gabino Sotelino, Ambria; Chicago, IL AND Roland Liccioni, Le Francais; Wheeling, IL
 Best Chef: New York City: Charles Palmer, Aureole; New York, NY
  Best Chef: Northeast: Jody Adams (chef), Rialto, The Charles Hotel; Cambridge, MA
  Best Chef: Pacific Northwest/Hawaii: Jeem Han Lock, Wild Ginger; Seattle, WA
  Best Chef: Southeast: Norman Van Aken, Norman's; Coral Gables, FL
  Best Chef: Southwest: George Mahaffey, Restaurant at Little Nell; Aspen, CO
 Best New Restaurant: Rose Pistola; San Francisco, CA
 Outstanding Chef : Thomas Keller, The French Laundry; Yountville, CA
 Outstanding Pastry Chef: Richard Leach, Park Avenue Cafe; New York, NY
 Outstanding Restaurant: Union Square Cafe; New York, NY
 Outstanding Service: Inn at Little Washington; Washington, VA
 Outstanding Wine & Spirits Professional: Zelma Long, Simi Winery; Healdsburg, CA
 Outstanding Wine Service: The Four Seasons; New York, NY
 Rising Star Chef: Michael Mina, Aqua; San Francisco, CA
 Humanitarian of the Year: Alice Waters, Chez Panisse; Berkeley, CA
 Lifetime Achievement Award: Joe Baum; New York, NY
 Outstanding Restaurant Design: Ferris Architects, Paci Restaurant; Southport, CT
 Outstanding Restaurant Graphics: Aerial, Lenox Room; New York, NY

Book Awards
 Cookbook Hall of Fame: French Provincial Cooking by Elizabeth David
 Cookbook of the Year: The Book of Jewish Food: An Odyssey from Samarkand to New York by Claudia Roden
 Baking & Desserts: Baking with Julia by Dorie Greenspan
 Best Food Photography: Lorenza's Pasta, photographer Gus Filgate 
 Foods of Americas: An American Place by Larry Forgione
 Fruits and Vegetables: Chez Panisse Vegetables by Alice Waters
 General: Recipes 1-2-3 by Rozanne Gold
 Healthy Focus: Moosewood Restaurant Low-Fat Favorites by The Moosewood Collective (Moosewood Restaurant)
 International: Patricia Wells at Home in Provence by Patricia Wells
 Italian: La Cucina Sicilina di Gangivecchio by Wanda Tornabene, Giovanna Tornabene, and Michele Evans
 Reference and Food Guides: Steven Jenkins Cheese Primer by Steven Jenkins
 Single Subject: The Pasta Bible by Christian Teubner, Silvio Rizzi, and Tan Leng
 Special Occasions: Seasons of the Vineyard by Robert Mondavi, Margit Biever Mondavi, and Carolyn Dille
 Vegetarian: 1000 Vegetarian Recipes by Carol Gelles
 Wine & Spirits: A Wine and Food Guide to the Loire by Jacqueline Friedrich
 Writing on Food: Olives: The Life and Lore of a Noble Fruit by Mort Rosenblum

Electronic Media Awards
 Best Local Television Cooking Show or Segment: Good Eating; host/producer: Steve Dolinsky, CLTV
 Best National Television Cooking Segment: Jacques Pepin's Kitchen: Cooking with Claudine; host: Jacques Pepin, producer: Peter Stein, KQED
 Best National Television Cooking Show: Baking with Julia; host; Julia Child, producers: Geoffrey Drummond and Nat Katzman, PBS
 Best Radio Show on Food: Food Talk with Laurann Claridge, host/producer: Laurann Claridge; KPRC
 Best TV Food Journalism: Janis Robinson's Wine Course; host/producer: Jancis Robinson, WEDH

Journalism Awards
 M.F.K. Fisher Distinguished Writing: Alan Richman, "As Long as There's a Moishe's, There'll Always Be a Montreal", GQ
 Magazine Feature with Recipes: Margo True, "Inside the CIA", Gourmet
 Magazine Feature without Recipes: Michele Anna Jordon, "Serving Wener Herzog's Shoe", San Francisco Focus
 Magazine Restaurant Review or Critique: Alan Richman, GQ
 Magazine Series: Jane and Michael Stern,  "Two for the Road", Gourmet
 Magazine Writing on Diet, Nutrition & Health: Peter Jaret, "Hyper Links", Eating Well
 Magazine Writing on Wine, Spirits and Beer: Gerald Asher, "Wine Journal: Beyond the Wine List", Gourmet
 Newspaper Feature Writing with Recipes: Jim Auchmutey, "Cast in Memory", The Atlanta Journal-Constitution
 Newspaper Feature Writing without Recipes: Robert Andrew Powell, "Eat Early, Eat Cheap", Miami New Times
 Newspaper News Reporting: Russ Parsons, "Toward a More 'Eatable' Nectarine", Los Angeles Times
 Newspaper Restaurant Review or Critique: Irene S. Virbila, Los Angeles Times
 Newspaper Series: Laurie Ochoa, "Taking Her Revolution Beyond the Kitchen," "Scenes from the Revolution," & "The Chez Panisse Years", Los Angeles Times
 Newspaper Writing on Diet, Nutrition & Health: Barbara Durbin, "To Wash or Not to Wash", The Oregonian
 Newspaper Writing on Spirits, Wine & Beer: David Shaw, "99 Bottles of Wine on the Block, 99 Bottles of Wine—Take One Down, Sell it Around, 98 Bottles of Wine on the Block", Los Angeles Times Magazine

1998 awards
The 1998 James Beard Awards were presented on May 4, 1998, at the New York Marriott Marquis. The journalism awards were announced on the preceding Friday.

Chef and Restaurant Awards
 Best Chef: California: Julian Serrano, Masa's; San Francisco, CA
 Best Chef: Mid-Atlantic: Georges Perrier, Le Bec-Fin; Philadelphia, PA
 Best Chef: Midwest: Sarah Stegner, Dining Room at The Ritz-Carlton; Chicago, IL
 Best Chef: New York City: Eric Ripert, Le Bernardin; New York, NY
  Best Chef: Northeast: Susan Regis, Biba (restaurant); Boston, MA
  Best Chef: Northwest: (TIE) Thierry Rautureau, Rover's; Seattle, WA AND Cory Schreiber, Wildwood; Portland, OR
  Best Chef: South: Frank Brigtsen, Brigtsen's; New Orleans, LA
  Best Chef: Southwest: Alessandro Stratta, Mary Elaine's at The Phoenician; Scottsdale, AZ
 Best New Restaurant: Jean Georges; New York, NY
 Outstanding Chef : (TIE) Jean-Georges Vongerichten, Jean Georges; New York, NY AND Wolfgang Puck, Spago Beverly Hills; Beverly Hills, CA
 Outstanding Pastry Chef: Stephen Durfee, The French Laundry; Yountville, CA
 Outstanding Restaurant: Le Bernardin; New York, NY
 Outstanding Service: The Four Seasons; New York, NY
 Outstanding Wine & Spirits Professional: Robert M. Parker; Monkton, MD
 Outstanding Wine Service: The Inn at Little Washington; Washington, VA
 Rising Star Chef: Keith Luce, Spruce; Aspen, CO
 Humanitarian of the Year: Rick Bayless; Chicago, IL
 Lifetime Achievement Award: Madeleine Kamman; Barre, VT
 Outstanding Restaurant Design: Yabu Pushelberg, Monsoon; Toronto, Canada
 Outstanding Restaurant Graphics: Dan Evans Graphics, The French Laundry; Yountville, CA

Book Awards
 Cookbook Hall of Fame: Maida Heatter's Book of Great Desserts by Maida Heatter
 Cookbook of the Year: The New Making of a Cook: The Art, Technique and Science of Cooking by Madeleine Kamman
 Baking & Desserts: The Best Bread Ever by Charlie Van Over
 Best Food Photography: The Mezzo Cookbook with John Torode, photographers Diana Miller and James Murphy
 Entertaining & Special Occasions: Entertaining 101: Everything You Need to Know to Entertain with Style and Grace by Linda West Eckhardt and Katherine West Defoyd
 Food of the Americas: Fiesta: A Celebration of Latin Hospitality by Anya von Bremzen
 Food of the Mediterranean: Marcella Cucina by Marcella Hazan
 Food Reference & Technique: CookWise: The Hows and Whys of Successful Cooking by Shirley Corriher
 General: The New Making of a Cook: The Art, Technique and Science of Good Cooking by Madeleine Kamman
 Healthy Focus: American Medical Association Family Health Cookbook: Good Food That's Good For You by Brooke Dojny, C. Wayne Callaway, and Melanie Barnard
 International: The Food and Flavors of Haute Provence by Georgeann Brennan
 Single Subject: The Splendid Grain by Rebecca Wood
 Vegetarian: Vegetarian Cooking for Everyone by Deborah Madison
 Wine & Spirits: Côte d'Or by Clive Coates
 Writing on Food: Cod: A Biography of the Fish That Changed the World by Mark Kurlansky

Electronic Media Awards
 Best Local Television Cooking Show or Segment: Good Eating; host: Steve Dolinsky, producers: Nelson Howard and Stephanie Kurtz, CLTV
 Best National Television Cooking Segment: Martha Stewart Living: Mrs. Maus's Fruitcake; host/producer: Martha Stewart, producer: Carolyn Kelly, CBS
 Best National Television Cooking Show: Pierre Franey's Cooking in Europe; host; Pierre Franey, producers: Charles Pinsky and John Potthast, MPT
 Best Local Radio Show On Food: Metropolis, host: Steve Dolinsky, producers: Justin Kaufmann and Aaron Freeman, WBEZ
 Best National Radio Show On Food: The Splendid Table, host: Lynne Rossetto Kasper, producers: Tom Voegeli and Sally Swift, PRI
 Best Television Food Journalism: Good Morning America-ABC News Greenmarket; host: Charles Gibson, producers: Margo Baumgard, Shelley Lewis, and Mark Lukasiewicz, ABC

Journalism Awards
 M.F.K. Fisher Distinguished Writing: Colman Andrews, "Cheese Toast", Saveur
 Magazine Feature with Recipes: Dorothy Kalins, "Kaiseki Modern: The Art of the Meal", Saveur
 Magazine Feature without Recipes: Molly O'Neill, "Chuck", San Francisco Magazine
 Magazine Restaurant Review or Critique: Alan Richman, GQ
 Magazine Series: Catharine Reynolds,  "Paris Journal", Gourmet
 Magazine Writing on Diet, Nutrition & Health: Paula Kurtzweil, "Today's Special: Nutrition Information", FDA Consumer
 Magazine Writing on Spirits, Wine & Beer: Gerald Asher, "Wine Journal: The French Do It Differently", Gourmet
 News Reporting: Jane Snow, "Raspberry Shipments from Guatemala Halted", Akron Beacon Journal
 Newspaper Feature Writing with Recipes: Carole Sugarman and Stephanie Witt Sedgwick, "How Low Can you Go? Cut the Butter? Cut the Sugar? Cut the Eggs? After Baking 23 Cakes, Here's What We Found", The Washington Post
 Newspaper Feature Writing without Recipes: Russ Parsons, "Our Strawberry Roots", Los Angeles Times
 Newspaper Restaurant Review or Critique: Ruth Reichl, The New York Times
 Newspaper Series: Carol Sugarman, "The Road to Food Safety? How the Government's New Rules Will (and Won't) Protect Your Dinner," "An End to Food Scares? Reconsidering Irradiation, with All Its Pros and Cons," & "Food Scares: Just a Hot Topic or Are They on the Rise?", The Washington Post
 Newspaper Writing on Diet, Nutrition & Health: Suzanne Martinson, "Picky! Picky!", Pittsburgh Post-Gazette
 Newspaper Writing on Spirits, Wine & Beer: Judith Weinraub, "It's Hot Out There!", The Washington Post

1999 awards
The 1999 James Beard Awards were presented on May 3, 1999, at the New York Marriott Marquis. The journalism awards were announced at an earlier ceremony.

Chef and Restaurant Awards
 Best Chef: California: Paul Bertolli, Oliveto; Oakland, CA
 Best Chef: Mid-Atlantic: Jeffrey Buben, Vidalia; Washington, DC
 Best Chef: Midwest: Michael Smith and Debbie Gold, The American Restaurant; Kansas City, MO
 Best Chef: New York City: Lidia Bastianich, Felidia; New York, NY
  Best Chef: Northeast: Melissa Kelly, Old Chatham (at Shepherding Co. Inn); Old Chatham, NY
  Best Chef: Northwest/Hawaii: Christine Keff, Flying Fish; Seattle, WA
  Best Chef: Southeast: Jamie Shannon, Commander's Palace; New Orleans, LA
  Best Chef: Southwest: RoxSand Scocos RoxSand; Phoenix, AZ
 Best New Restaurant: Babbo; New York, NY
 Outstanding Chef : Charlie Trotter, Charlie Trotter's; Chicago, IL
 Outstanding Pastry Chef: Marcel Desaulniers, The Trellis; Williamsburg, VA
 Outstanding Restaurant: The Four Seasons; New York, NY
 Outstanding Service: Le Bernardin; New York, NY
 Outstanding Wine & Spirits Professional: Frank Prial; New York, NY
 Outstanding Wine Service: Union Square Cafe; New York, NY
 Rising Star Chef: Marcus Samuelsson, Aquavit; New York, NY
 Humanitarian of the Year: Mary Risley; San Francisco, CA
 Lifetime Achievement Award: Ferdinand Metz; Beacon, NY
 Outstanding Restaurant Design: Mark Cavagnero Assoc., MC Squared; San Francisco, CA
 Outstanding Restaurant Graphics: Propp & Gerin, MC Squared; San Francisco, CA

Book Awards
 Cookbook Hall of Fame: The Doubleday Cookbook, Jean Anderson Cooks, The Food of Portugal, The Nutrition Bible, and The American Century Cookbook by Jean Anderson
 Cookbook of the Year: Smokehouse Ham, Spoon Bread & Scuppernong Wine by Joseph Dabney
 Americana: Saveur Cooks Authentic American by Colman Andrews and Dorothy Kalins
 Baking & Desserts: Crust & Crumb: Master Formulas For Serious Bread Makers by Peter Reinhart
 Best Food Photography: Charlie Trotter's Desserts, photographers Tim Turner and Paul Elledge
 Chefs and Restaurants: Jean-Georges: Cooking at Home with a Four-Star Chef by Jean-Georges Vongerichten  and Mark Bittman
 Entertaining & Special Occasions: Nathalie Dupree's Comfortable Entertaining by Nathalie Dupree
 General: How to Cook Everything by Mark Bittman
 Healthy Focus: Steven Raichlen's Healthy Latin Cooking: 200 Sizzling Recipes from Mexico, Cuba, Caribbean, Brazil and Beyond by Steven Raichlen
 International: Mediterranean Grains and Greens by Paula Wolfert and Ellen Brown
 Reference and Writings on Food: Man Eating Bugs: The Art of Eating Insects by Peter Menzel and Faith D'Aluisio
 Single Subject: Wild About Game by Janie Hibler
 Vegetables and Vegetarian: Vegetables by James Peterson
 Wine & Spirits: 1855: A History of the Bordeaux Classification by Dewey Markham, Jr.

Broadcast Media Awards
 Best Local Television Food Broadcast: Good Eating; host/producer: Steve Dolinsky, producers: Nelson Howard and Stephanie Kurtz, CLTV
 Best National T.V. Food Journalism: Great Food; host: Molly O'Neill, producers: John McEwen and Christine Rylko, KCTS
 Best National Television Cooking Show: Jacques Pepin's Kitchen: Encore with Claudine; host; Jacques Pepin, producers: Peggy Lee Scott and Peter Stein, KQED
 Best Radio Show on Food: Bloomberg Executive Dining Guide, host: Peter Elliot, producers: Carmen Matias and Lori Hoffman, WBBR
 Best Radio Segment On Food: Weekend Edition, Sunday, host: Liane Hansen, producers: Robert Malesky and Carline Windall, NPR

Journalism Awards
 M.F.K. Fisher Distinguished Writing: Corby Kummer, "Carried Away", The New York Times Magazine
 Magazine Feature with Recipes: Colman Andrews, "Burgundy: The Glory of French Food", Saveur
 Magazine Feature without Recipes: Michael Ruhlman, "An Alphabet Test of Nerves", Food Arts
 Magazine Restaurant Review or Critique: Arthur Lubow, Departures
 Magazine Series: Jane and Michael Stern,  "Two For the Road", Gourmet
 Magazine Writing on Diet, Nutrition & Health: Jeffrey Steingarten, "Addicted to Losing", Vogue
 Magazine Writing on Spirits, Wine & Beer: William A. Marsano, "Great Scotch", Hemispheres
 News Reporting: Andy Badeker, "Gone Fishing", Chicago Tribune
 Newspaper Feature Writing with Recipes: Marian Burros, "Peektoe Crab: A Star is Born", The New York Times
 Newspaper Feature Writing without Recipes: David Karp, "Asian Pears", Los Angeles Times
 Newspaper Restaurant Review or Critique: Jonathan Gold, L.A. Weekly
 Newspaper Series: Kristin Eddy, Andy Badeker, and Andrew Solomon, American Originals: "A Piece of Heaven," "Chicken Fried State," & "The One True Cue", Chicago Tribune
 Newspaper Writing on Diet, Nutrition & Health: Cheri Swoboda and Merle Alexander, "Fill Up on Calcium", The Oregonian
 Newspaper Writing on Spirits, Wine & Beer: Janet Fletcher, "Sending Back the Bottle", San Francisco Chronicle

References

James Beard Foundation Award winners